Sergey Tereshchenkov (27 April 1938 – 11 April 2006) was a Soviet cyclist. He competed in the team pursuit at the 1964 Summer Olympics.

References

1938 births
2006 deaths
Soviet male cyclists
Olympic cyclists of the Soviet Union
Cyclists at the 1964 Summer Olympics